Ralph Banthorpe (born 6 February 1949) is a retired British international sprinter. He competed in the men's 200 metres at the 1968 Summer Olympics.

He also represented England in the 200 metres, at the 1970 British Commonwealth Games in Edinburgh, Scotland.

References

1949 births
Living people
Athletes (track and field) at the 1968 Summer Olympics
British male sprinters
English male sprinters
Olympic athletes of Great Britain
Athletes (track and field) at the 1970 British Commonwealth Games
Commonwealth Games competitors for England